Parahancornia is a genus of flowering plants in the family Apocynaceae, first described as a genus in 1922. It is native to South America.

Species
The following species are currently recognized under Parahancornia:
 Parahancornia amara (Markgr.) Monach. - Amazonas State in Brazil
 Parahancornia fasciculata (Poir.) Benoist - Colombia, Venezuela, 3 Guianas, N Brazil, Peru, Bolivia
 Parahancornia krukovii Monach. - Amazonas State in Brazil
 Parahancornia negroensis Monach. - Amazonas State in Brazil, Amazonas State in Venezuela
 Parahancornia oblonga (Benth. ex Mull. Arg.) Monach.  - Amazon Basin
 Parahancornia peruviana Monach.  - Peru
 Parahancornia surrogata Zarucchi - Amazon Basin

References

 
Apocynaceae genera
Flora of South America
Taxa named by Adolpho Ducke